Calciphilopteris is a genus of ferns in the family Pteridaceae. It is native to India and China, southward to Australia. Its four species grow in crevices in limestone or they cling to the rock itself.

Taxonomy 
For a long time, the four species of Calciphilopteris were included in the polyphyletic genus Doryopteris. Molecular phylogenetic studies have shown that Calciphilopteris is the most basal clade in the subfamily Cheilanthoideae. It is thus far removed from Doryopteris palmata, the type species of Doryopteris.

Calciphilopteris was described as a new genus in 2010. The generic name is said to be derived from the Greek calx (limestone), philus (loving), and pteris (fern). Kalx can not be found in ancient Greek, however calx is the Latin word for "limestone", possibly derived from ancient Greek chalix (χάλιξ) or derived from a word from a different Mediterranean language. The proper word in ancient Greek for "loving" is philos (φίλος).

Species 
, the Checklist of Ferns and Lycophytes of the World recognized the following species:
 Calciphilopteris alleniae  (R.M.Tryon) Yesilyurt & H.Schneider 
 Calciphilopteris ludens  (Wall. ex Hook.) Yesilyurt & H.Schneider 
 Calciphilopteris papuana  (Copel.) Yesilyurt & H.Schneider 
 Calciphilopteris wallichii  (J.Sm.) Yesilyurt & H.Schneider

References

External links 
 Calciphilopteris At: Volume 7 At: Online content At: Phytotaxa
 Calciphilopteris At: Plant Names At: IPNI
 Calciphilopteris (exact) At: Names At: Tropicos At: Science and Conservation At: Missouri Botanical Garden

Pteridaceae
Fern genera